Linyphia is a genus of  dwarf spiders that was first described by Pierre André Latreille in 1804. The name is Greek, and means "thread-weaver" or "linen maker".

Species
 it contains seventy-eight species, found in Albania, Algeria, Argentina, Australia, Austria, Brazil, Canada, Chile, China, Colombia, Costa Rica, Ethiopia, France, Germany, Greece, Guatemala, Guyana, Indonesia, Iran, Israel, Italy, Japan, Kazakhstan, Lebanon, Mexico, Myanmar, Nepal, Panama, Peru, Russia, Samoa, Sweden, Switzerland, São Tomé and Príncipe, Thailand, Turkey, and the United States:

L. adstricta (Keyserling, 1886) – Utah, Baja California
L. albipunctata O. Pickard-Cambridge, 1885 – China (Yarkand)
L. alpicola van Helsdingen, 1969 – Alps (France, Italy, Switzerland, Germany, Austria)
L. armata (Keyserling, 1891) – Brazil
L. bicuspis (F. O. Pickard-Cambridge, 1902) – Mexico
L. bifasciata (F. O. Pickard-Cambridge, 1902) – Costa Rica
L. bisignata (Banks, 1909) – Costa Rica
L. calcarifera (Keyserling, 1886) – Panama, Colombia
L. catalina Gertsch, 1951 – Arizona (Chiricahua Mountain Area)
L. chiapasia Gertsch & Davis, 1946 – Mexico
L. chiridota (Thorell, 1895) – Myanmar, Thailand
L. clara (Keyserling, 1891) – Brazil
L. confinis O. Pickard-Cambridge, 1902 – Guatemala
L. consanguinea O. Pickard-Cambridge, 1885 – China (Yarkand)
L. cylindrata (Keyserling, 1891) – Brazil
L. decorata (Keyserling, 1891) – Brazil
L. duplicata (F. O. Pickard-Cambridge, 1902) – Mexico, Guatemala
L. eiseni Banks, 1898 – Mexico
L. emertoni Thorell, 1875 – Labrador, Canada
L. falculifera (F. O. Pickard-Cambridge, 1902) – Costa Rica
L. ferentaria (Keyserling, 1886) – Peru
L. horaea (Keyserling, 1886) – Colombia
L. hortensis Sundevall, 1830 – Europe, Turkey, Caucasus, Russia (Europe to Far East), Kazakhstan, Central Asia
L. hospita (Keyserling, 1886) – Colombia
L. hui Hu, 2001 – China
L. karschi Roewer, 1942 – São Tomé and Príncipe
L. lambda (F. O. Pickard-Cambridge, 1902) – Guatemala
L. lehmanni Simon, 1903 – Argentina
L. leucosternon White, 1841 – Brazil
L. limatula Simon, 1904 – Chile
L. limbata (F. O. Pickard-Cambridge, 1902) – Mexico, Guatemala
L. lineola Pavesi, 1883 – Ethiopia
L. linguatula (F. O. Pickard-Cambridge, 1902) – Guatemala
L. linzhiensis Hu, 2001 – China
L. longiceps (Keyserling, 1891) – Brazil
L. longispina (F. O. Pickard-Cambridge, 1902) – Mexico
L. ludibunda (Keyserling, 1886) – Peru
L. lurida (Keyserling, 1886) – Colombia
L. maculosa (Banks, 1909) – Costa Rica
L. maura Thorell, 1875 – Western Mediterranean
L. melanoprocta Mello-Leitão, 1944 – Argentina
L. menyuanensis Hu, 2001 – China
L. mimonti Simon, 1885 – Italy, Albania, Greece (incl. Crete), Lebanon, Israel
L. monticolens Roewer, 1942 – Peru
L. neophita Hentz, 1850 – North Carolina
L. nepalensis Wunderlich, 1983 – Nepal
L. nigrita (F. O. Pickard-Cambridge, 1902) – Mexico, Guatemala
L. nitens Urquhart, 1893 – Australia (Tasmania)
L. obesa Thorell, 1875 – Sweden
L. obscurella Roewer, 1942 – Brazil
L. octopunctata (Chamberlin & Ivie, 1936) – Panama
L. oligochronia (Keyserling, 1886) – Peru
L. orophila Thorell, 1877 – Colorado (Gray's Peak)
L. peruana (Keyserling, 1886) – Peru
L. petrunkevitchi Roewer, 1942 – Guatemala
L. phaeochorda Rainbow, 1920 – Australia (Norfolk Is.)
L. phyllophora Thorell, 1890 – Indonesia (Sumatra)
L. polita Blackwall, 1870 – Italy (Sicily)
L. postica (Banks, 1909) – Costa Rica
L. rita Gertsch, 1951 – Arizona (Chiricahua Mountain Area)
L. rubella Keyserling, 1886 – Peru
L. rubriceps (Keyserling, 1891) – Brazil
L. rustica (F. O. Pickard-Cambridge, 1902) – Mexico
L. sagana Dönitz & Strand, 1906 – Japan
L. sikkimensis Tikader, 1970 – India
L. simplicata (F. O. Pickard-Cambridge, 1902) – Guatemala
L. subluteae Urquhart, 1893 – Australia (Tasmania)
L. tauphora Chamberlin, 1928 – Utah (Zion National Park) & Washington (San Juan County)
L. tenuipalpis Simon, 1884 – Algeria, Europe, Turkey, Caucasus, Russia (Europe to South Siberia)
L. textrix Walckenaer, 1841 – USA (Georgia)
L. triangularis (Clerck, 1757) (type) – Europe, Turkey, Caucasus, Russia (Europe to Far East), Iran, Kazakhstan, China. Introduced to USA
L. triangularoides Schenkel, 1936 – China, USA (Introduced)
L. trifalcata (F. O. Pickard-Cambridge, 1902) – Guatemala
L. tuasivia Marples, 1955 – Samoa, Cook Is. (Aitutaki)
L. tubernaculofaciens Hingston, 1932 – Guyana
L. virgata (Keyserling, 1886) – Peru
L. xilitla Gertsch & Davis, 1946 – Mexico
L. yangmingensis Yin, 2012 – China

See also
 List of Linyphiidae species (I–P)

References

Araneomorphae genera
Cosmopolitan spiders
Linyphiidae
Taxa named by Pierre André Latreille